Kustaa Ruuskanen (23 March 1881, Rantasalmi – 9 March 1971) was a Finnish farmer and politician. He served as a Member of the Parliament of Finland from 1919 to 1922, representing the National Progressive Party.

References

1881 births
1971 deaths
People from Rantasalmi
People from Mikkeli Province (Grand Duchy of Finland)
National Progressive Party (Finland) politicians
Members of the Parliament of Finland (1919–22)